Miquel Martínez Moya (born 28 June 1984), commonly known as Miki, is a Spanish footballer who plays as a midfielder.

Football career
Born in Berga, Barcelona, Catalonia, brought up in the local RCD Espanyol youth ranks, Miki spent the bulk of his years in the reserves. In two consecutive matchdays in the 2005–06 season, he managed two substitute appearances for the first team: at Villarreal CF (0–4 loss) and at home against Sevilla FC (5–0 win).

In the summer of 2006, Miki was released and joined another club in La Liga, Getafe CF, but was immediately loaned to the Real Jaén and never appeared again for the former side. Released, he resumed his career in the third division with the CE Sabadell FC and the UE Lleida.

Still in his province of birth, in 2010–11 Miki signed with the Gimnàstic de Tarragona in the second tier. His last experience at the professional level came during the following campaign at the age of 27, eventually being relegated to the CD Alcoyano.

Honours

International
Spain U23
Mediterranean Games: 2005

References

External links

1984 births
Living people
People from Berguedà
Sportspeople from the Province of Barcelona
Spanish footballers
Footballers from Catalonia
Association football midfielders
La Liga players
Segunda División players
Segunda División B players
Tercera División players
RCD Espanyol B footballers
RCD Espanyol footballers
Getafe CF footballers
Real Jaén footballers
CE Sabadell FC footballers
UE Lleida players
Gimnàstic de Tarragona footballers
CD Alcoyano footballers
Deportivo Alavés players
UE Olot players
CD Castellón footballers
Terrassa FC footballers
Spain under-23 international footballers
Mediterranean Games medalists in football
Mediterranean Games gold medalists for Spain
Competitors at the 2005 Mediterranean Games